World Medical & Health Policy is a quarterly e-only peer-reviewed academic journal published by Wiley-Blackwell on behalf of the Policy Studies Organization.  The journal was established in 2009.  The current editor-in-chief is Daniel Skinner of Ohio University.  The journal focuses on public health, public policy, the politics of medicine and health care.  It aims to disseminate high quality research that has the potential of informing policy formation and improving health outcomes globally. The journal's editorial board has grown increasingly global over recent years, with a particular focus on Africa and Asia.

External links 
 

Wiley-Blackwell academic journals
English-language journals
Publications established in 2009
Political science journals
Health policy journals
Medical journals
Quarterly journals